Dorothy Margarette Selby Lowndes, writing as Dolf Wyllarde (3 April 1871 - 10 May 1950) was a British journalist and a writer of verse and fiction. From 1897 to 1939, she was known to publish in excess of 30 books, including novels, stories and children's literature. Numerous reviews of her work mistakenly referred to her as a male due to misunderstanding of her chosen name, with some believing it to be a pen name.

She was described by one newspaper as being "one of the pioneers in the latest phase of English fiction" and as "a new power in the fiction world, a power to be reckoned with". Little is known about her private life and she died a spinster in May 1950.

Early work
Born on 3 April 1871 according to the 1939 England register, she was educated at King's College London. She described herself as being a London correspondent, sports editor, reporter and a paragraphist. She suffered from being overworked in 1902 and took a short visit to South Africa "for the sake of her health".  She published over 30 books between 1897 and 1939, including collections of stories, children's books, and many novels.<ref name=ford>{{cite web |title=[ Dolf Wyllarde [ Dorothy Margarette Selby Lowndes ], popular female novelist ] Autograph Letter Signed and two Typed Letters Signed (all three Dolf Wyllarde') requesting information to assist her in the writing of her books. |url=http://www.richardfordmanuscripts.co.uk/keywords/dolf |website=www.richardfordmanuscripts.co.uk |publisher=Richard Ford |access-date=1 January 2021}}</ref>

In 1902, her novel The Story of Eden was described by New York's The Brooklyn Daily Eagle as being "one of the brightest and cleverest novels that England has recently sent us". Wyllarde recalled that the novel came about from a visit in 1889 to South Africa on account of illness, as she had "broken down from over-work". Some of the book was written while she was in Wynberg and she continued with it on her journey home. Despite being unwell, she conveyed that her training in journalism taught her quick writing and to write regardless whether she was ill or without inclination, noting that in her opinion, there was "no school so excellent for a writer as that of journalism." The Brooklyn Daily Eagle would also later describe her in July 1907 as being "one of the pioneers in the latest phase of English fiction." Upon release of her novel Captain Amyas, described as "a strong, masterly piece of fiction", she was being described as "a new power in the fiction world, a power to be reckoned with". Her novel Rose-White Youth, a love story about a 15-year-old girl released in 1908, was considered a departure from the "realistic and plain spoken style which characterized her other books", with The Brooklyn Daily Eagle suggesting that her regular readers may find the novel "rather milk and water", although acknowledged many would appreciate the style of story. In 1913 she was elected a fellow of the Royal Geographical Society.

Her poem "Rondeaux d'Amour" was published in volume 4 of The Yellow Book and she published two other collections of poetry.
 
Later work
Her 1916 novel Exile: an outpost of empire was the basis of a 1917 American film, and The Holiday Husband was filmed in 1920 featuring Adeline Hayden Coffin.

Personal
During the early 20th century, there was speculation as to whether her name was a pen name, which was a commonly held view according to The Brooklyn Daily Eagle'' in May 1902. Responding to the suggestion, Wyllarde conveyed her amusement "by the incredulity cast" on her name, assuring those who doubted it as being her actual name that her own friends could "testify as to its extreme suitability" and that she was not able to imagine being named anything other than Dolf. She would also sometimes be incorrectly referred to as a male writer, with critics believing she was a man and the press congratulating "Mr Wyllarde" on "his new and instant success".

Little is known about her life, except that she lived at Old Mixon Manor near Weston-super-Mare. She was boarding with several other people in Weymouth, Dorset at the time of the 1911 census. She made several summer trips by ship to Marseilles over a period of several years in the 1930s, such as in July 1931 at the age of 60, June 1932 at the age of 61, and in July 1933.

Wyllarde died a spinster on 10 May 1950, leaving effects worth just over £49443.

References

External links

 

Works by Wyllarde available as full text facsimiles at the Internet Archive

1871 births
1950 deaths
Alumni of King's College London
English women poets
19th-century English poets
English women novelists
20th-century English novelists
20th-century English women
20th-century English people
19th-century English women
Pseudonymous women writers
19th-century pseudonymous writers
20th-century pseudonymous writers